Prier is a surname. Notable people with it include:

Bob Prier (born 1976), Canadian ice hockey coach and former player
Peter Prier (1942–2015), German-American violin maker

See also
Pryor
Pryer
Pry (disambiguation)
Prior (disambiguation)